My Husband Won't Fit is a Japanese-language television series starring Natsumi Ishibashi and Aoi Nakamura. The plot revolves around Kumiko (Natsumi Ishibashi) and Kenichi (Aoi Nakamura) who become a couple in college. Later they discover that they are physically incompatible, and problems emanate from a marriage that is not able to be consummated.

It was released on March 20, 2019 on Fuji TV.

Cast
 Natsumi Ishibashi
 Aoi Nakamura

Release
My Husband Won't Fit was released on March 20, 2019 on Fuji TV.

Adaptations
A manga adaptation by Kodama, with art by Yukiko Gotō, was released in 2018 and serialized in Young Magazine.

References

External links
 
 
 

Japanese-language television shows
Television shows set in Japan
Japanese drama television series
2019 Japanese television series debuts
Fuji TV dramas
Japanese-language Netflix original programming